The Texas blind salamander (Eurycea rathbuni) is a rare cave-dwelling troglobite amphibian native to San Marcos, Hays County, Texas, specifically the San Marcos Pool of the Edwards Aquifer.

Description
The species has a  broad, flat, snout and head, and vestigial eyes beneath that are covered by skin. Like other neotenous salamanders, it has external gills for absorbing oxygen from the water. The forelimbs carry four digits and the hind limbs possess five digits. Its diet varies by what flows into its cave, and includes blind shrimp (Palaemonetes antrorum), snails, and amphipods.

Distribution and habitat
Specimens have been collected at seven localities in the Purgatory Creek system and along the San Marcos Fault near San Marcos, Texas. Adults and immature larvae are well-adapted for living in underground streams in caves, and many probably inhabit deep recesses that are not accessible to collectors. Specimens have been taken in deep pools with minimal current and nearly constant 21-22 °C temperatures. The first specimens of this species were collected in 1895 from a newly constructed well that drew water from 58 m below the surface.

Breeding and courtship

The time of breeding is poorly documented. Dunn (1926) noted a specimen maintained in the laboratory laid a few eggs on March 15 and a specimen collected in early fall had the spermatheca packed with spermatozoa. Very small juveniles have been found throughout the year, suggesting a seasonal breeding pattern.
Bechler (1988) observed one complete and two partial courtship bouts in captive specimens in which the female initiated courtship and the male remained passive initially. Courtship begins when the female approaches the male and rubs her chin on his dorsum. The female may also rub her cloaca on nearby rocks while rocking to and fro. If the male does not respond, the female may nip the male along the sides or engage in kicking behavior in which gravel is scratched with the hind limbs. The female eventually straddles the tail of the male and rubs her snout above the tail base. The male responds by arching his pelvic region and fanning his tail between her legs. The female then rubs her snout more rapidly over the base of the tail. The male may lead the female forward and repeat the same cycle while slowly vibrating the anterior third of the tail. The male eventually bends the body laterally and moves the tail laterally at a right angle to the body while the female continues rubbing the base of the tail. The male then leads the female forward, bends his body into an S-shaped pattern, and deposits a spermatophore on the substrate. He next leads the female forward with the tail extended laterally until she picks up the spermatophore cap with her cloacal lips. The spermatophore consists of a crescent-shaped white sperm cap over a clear, gelatinous base that is about four times longer than it is wide.

See also

 Axolotl
 Blanco blind salamander

References

External links
University of Michigan Museum of Zoology

ESA endangered species
Eurycea
Cave salamanders
Amphibians of the United States
Endemic fauna of Texas
San Marcos, Texas
Amphibians described in 1896
Taxa named by Leonhard Stejneger